Oleg Yevdokimov (born 25 February 1994) is a Belarusian footballer who plays for Dinamo Minsk.

External links

Profile at pressball.by

1994 births
Living people
Belarusian footballers
Association football midfielders
Belarusian expatriate footballers
Expatriate footballers in Kazakhstan
Belarus international footballers
FC Minsk players
FC Neman Grodno players
FC Turan players
FC Dinamo Minsk players